"La Delgadina" is a Mexican folk song, or corrido, centering on a young lady that disobeys her father's wish to be his wife, ending with her tragic death. It's a story of incest, but later used during the Mexican Revolution to depict the power struggles between the classes. La Delgadina has its origins in Spain  as a longer ballad with a more-descriptive background; it was simplified in Mexico in the 18th-century just alluding to the fact of Delgadina's refusal and later punishment.

Storyline
The storyline goes as Delgadina, a young lady that wears a silk dress wanders around her living room. Her father instructs her to wear her silk skirt (nagua de seda in Spanish) to travel to Morelia to church for Mass.

After Mass, her father (described as a king) tells her of his longing to marry her. Delgadina refuses, saying, "God of Heaven and the sovereign queen forbid this offense to God and treason to my mother".

Delgadina's father then locks her up with the help of his eleven servants. Delgadina apparently spends days locked in a tower and pleads to her father for water. Upon hearing this, the father quickly sends the eleven servants to give Delgadina water in a gold cup. Unfortunately, they find her dead with her arms crossed and her mouth open.

The ending describes Delgadina's heavenly ascension, and her father's infernal demise.

Later interpretations
The song has been made famous by Mexican artists such as Irma Serrano, Dueto América, and Las Hermanas Mendoza.

An adaptation of La Deldadina was featured in the 1987 television film Corridos: Tales of Passion & Revolution, directed by Luis Valdez and adapted from his play. In the segment for La Delgadina, Evelyn Cisneros plays Delgadina.

In 2008, a direct-to-video film based on the ballad was released with the name of El Corrido de Delgadina. It stars Jorge Gómez as the father and Carmelita López as Delgadina.

In the novel Memories of My Melancholy Whores by Gabriel García Márquez, the 90-year-old narrator sings the song to an underage prostitute who reminds him of Delgadina.  He desires her though he knows it is illegal and morally wrong.

Lyrics

References

Mexican corridos